Culture Press is an independent record label from UK specialized in Jamaican music.

LP Discography
VSLP5000 - Bob Marley - Interviews
VSLP5001 - Clint Eastwood - The Best Of Clint Eastwood - 1984
VSLP5002 - Dillinger - Blackboard Jungle - 1984
VSLP5003 - David Isaacs - Place In The Sun - 1984
VSLP5004 - Max Romeo Meets Owen Gray At King Tubby's Studio - 1984
VSLP5005 - U Brown - Superstar - 1984
VSLP5006 - Barry Brown - The Best Of Barry Brown - 1984
VSLP5007 - Cornell Campbell - Meets The Gaylads (With Sly And Robbie) - 1985
VSLP5008 - Winston Jarrett - Rocking Vibration - 1984
VSLP5009 - Horace Andy - The Best Of Horace Andy - 1985
VSLP5014 - Sly and Robbie Meet King Tubby - 1985
VSLP5017 - Trinity - The Best Of Trinity - 1984

Incomplete CD Discography
CP304 - The Cimarons - People Say
CP305 - U Roy - Super Boss
CP306 - Jacob Miller - With The Inner Circle Band & Augustus Pablo
CP312 - Skatalites - Musical Communion: Duke Reid Sessions (2000)
CP314 - Various - Jamaican Beat 1968-1973
CP315 - Various - Top Rock Steady 1966-1971
CP407 - Jackie Mittoo - Show Case
CP502 - I Roy - Crisis Time (1976)
CP503 - The Aggrovators - Meets The Revolutionaries At Channel One
CP504 - Dillinger - Three Piece Suit 
CP506 - Clint Eastwood - Real Clint Eastwood
CP512 - Tommy McCook - Show Case (with The Aggrovators) (1975)
CP601 - Toyan - Ghetto Man Skank (1988)
CP602 - Various - Midnight Rock Classics Vol 01 (1981–1982)
CP603 - Triston Palma - Entertainment
CP604 - Jah Thomas - Dance Hall Connection
CP605 - Early B - Send In The Patient
CP0301 - Black Uhuru - Love Dub (1990)
CP0308 - Various - Jazz In Jamaica (2001)
CP0505 - Augustus Pablo - Meets King Tubby in Roots Vibes
CP0508 - Leroy Smart - Super Star (2001)
CP0511 - Jackie Mittoo - Showcase (2001)
CP0606 - Anthony Johnson - Reggae Feelings 1982-1984
CP1014 - Bob Marley- Mr Chatterbox
CP1034 - Bob Marley - Rock Steady & Early Reggae Sides (2001)
CP3001 - I Roy - Sincerely Yours (Straight To The Heart & Sunshine For I)
CP3002 - Gregory Isaacs - Cool Ruler (I'll Never Trust You Again & No Luck)
CP3003 - Yellowman - Just Cool (Fantastic Yellowman & Saturday Night)
CP3004 - Dillinger - Reble With A Cause (Funky Ounk & Killer Man Jaro
CP3005 - Various - Bunny lee Meets King Tubby and The Aggrovators
CP3009 - Dennis Brown - Here I Come Again 1971-1976
CP3010 - Bad Manners - Best Baddest & Ugliest
CP3012 - Johnny Osbourne - Dancing Time (2000)
CP3011 - Desmond Dekker - Action (2000)
CP3014 - Heptones - Heptones Dictionary (2000)
CP3015 - Ethiopians - Meets Sir JJ & Friends (2000)
CP3016 - Lee Perry - Meets Mad Professor
CP3017 - Various - Creation Rebel + Dub (2000)
CP3016 - Lee Perry - Meets The Mad Professor
CP4002 - King Tubby - Fatman Tapes
CP4003 - Don Carlos - Lazer Beal (1982–1983)
CP4004 - Prince Lincoln - Unite The World (1983)
CP4006 - King Tubby - Fatman Tapes Part 2 1978-1982
CP4009 - Alton Ellis - Many Moods Of Alton Ellis 1978-1980
CP4010 - Barry Brown - BarryBrown Meets Cornell Campbell 1977-1982
CP4011 - Johnny Clarke - King In The Arena (1978)
CP4012 - Heptones - King Of The Town (2001)
CP4013 - Horace Andy - Zion Gate 1973-1978
CP4015 - Zap Pow - Now
CP6003 - Bob Marley - Soul Captives 1969-1970
CP6010 - Bob Marley - Jamaican Singles Volume 1969-1972
CP6012 - King Tubby - Roots & Society (with Lee Perry)
CP6013 - Toots & the Maytals - Don't Trouble (2000)
CP6017 - Sly & Robbie - Meet King Tubby 1974-1977
CP6020 - Lee Perry - Glory Dub (2000)
CP6021 - Various - Reggae Collection Vol 03 (2000)
CP6022 - Various - Reggae Collection Vol 04 (2000)
CP6023 - Various - Reggae Collection Vol 05 (2000)
CP6024 - Ras Michael - New Name
CP6027 - I Roy - Meet At King Tubby's Studio (2000) (with Dillinger)
CP6028 - Various - Leroy Smart & Friends 1976-1978
CP6030 - King Tubby - Bionic Dub 1975-1977
CP8001 - Ras Michael - Trilogy 1975-1979
CP8002 - Jacob Miller - Trilogy (2000)
CP8003 - Skatalites - Trilogy (2000)
CP8004 - Lee Perry - Trilogy 1975-1977
CP8006 - I-Roy - DJ Trilogy 1975-1979 (with Clint Eastwood & Jah Stitch)
CP8010 - Various -  - Ska To Rock Steady Trilogy (2000)
CP9001 - Dennis Brown - Reggae Best (2001)
CP9002 - Cimarons - Reggae Best (2001)
CP9003 - Jimmy Cliff - Reggae Best (2001)
CP9004 - Dillinger - Reggae Best (2001)
CP9005 - King Tubby - Fatman Meet Tubby - Reggae Best (2001)
CP9006 - Heptones - Reggae Best (2001)
CP9007 - Gregory Isaacs - Reggae Best (2001)
CP9008 - Israel Vibration - Reggae Best (2001)
CP9009 - Bob Marley - Reggae Best (2001)
CP9010 - Ras Michael - Reggae Best (2001)
CP9011 - Augustus Pablo - Reggae Best (2001)
CP9012 - Lee Perry - Reggae Best (2001)
CP9013 - I Roy - Reggae Best (2001)
CP9014 - U Roy - Reggae Best (2001)
CP9015 - Toots & the Maytals - Reggae Best (2001)
CP9016 - King Tubby - Reggae Best (2001)
CP9017 - Yellowman - Reggae Best (2001)
CP9018 - Various - Reggae Best - The DJ's (2001)
CP9019 - Various - Reggae Best - Rub A Dub Style (2001)
CP9020 - Various - Reggae Best - The Singers (2001)
CPBX804 - Lee Perry - Trilogy 1975-1977
CPBX8005 - King Tubby - Trilogy 1974-1979
CPBX8007 - Toyan - Midnight Rock Trilogy 1981-1983 (with Jah Thomas & Early B)
CPBX8011 - Various - Reggae From Jamaica (2001)
CPBX8012 - Bob Marley - First Tracks (2001)
BBCP2001 - Bob Marley - War Album (With Haile Selassie-Wailers-Etc.)
Bob Marley - Complete Soul Rebels & Upsetter Record Shop
Dillinger - Cornbread (1981)
Leroy Smart - Superstar
Lee Perry - In Dub Confrontation Vol 01 & 02 (with King Tubby)
Lee Perry - Heart Of The Dragon (1975)
Jah Stitch - The Killer (1975–1977)
Keith Tippett, Hugh Hopper, Elton Dean, Joe Gallivan - Mercy Dash (1996 CD / 1985 LP)

See also
 List of record labels

Reggae record labels
British independent record labels